Guran is a rural locality (a selo) in Sychevsky Selsoviet of Svobodnensky District, Amur Oblast, Russia. The population is 132 as of 2018. There are 6 streets.

Geography 
Guran is located 87 km southwest of Svobodny (the district's administrative centre) by road. Sychyovka is the nearest rural locality.

References 

Rural localities in Svobodnensky District